Bernard Anthony Wright (born 8 June 1940) is a Northern Irish former footballer. In English football he was nicknamed "Paddy". He played on the right-wing for Sligo Rovers, Port Vale, and Stafford Rangers.

Career
Wright played for Sligo Rovers before crossing the Irish Sea to try his luck in England with Norman Low's Port Vale in August 1962. He replaced John Rowland as the Vale's number 7, but in November new manager Freddie Steele dropped Wright for Rowland. He made 14 Third Division and one League Cup appearances for the "Valiants", and scored goals in a 1–0 win over Colchester United at Layer Road (10 September) and a 2–1 win over Watford at Vicarage Road (18 May). Wright was loaned out to Stafford Rangers in April 1963, before leaving Vale Park on a free transfer the next month.

Career statistics
Source:

References

Sportspeople from Derry (city)
Association footballers from Northern Ireland
Association football wingers
Sligo Rovers F.C. players
Port Vale F.C. players
Stafford Rangers F.C. players
English Football League players
1940 births
Living people